Alves is a surname that appears to originate both from Portugal and Scotland. It is debatable whether the surname appeared first in one country or the other, since it is more prevalent in Portugal, but registered as far back as the 13th century in the church records at Alves, Moray, Northern Scotland. 

Notable people with the surname include:

Adriana Alves (born 1995), Angolan sprinter
Afonso Alves (born 1981), Brazilian footballer
Anastácio Alves (born 1963), missing Madeiran Roman Catholic priest
Bruno Alves (born 1981), Portuguese footballer
Camila Alves (born 1982), Brazilian  model and television performer
Carlos Alberto Alves Garcia (born 1982), Portuguese footballer known as "Carlitos"
Dani Alves (born 1983), Brazilian footballer
Daniel Miguel Alves Gomes (born 1983), Portuguese footballer known as "Danny"
Diego Alves (born 1985), Brazilian footballer
Jéssika Alves (born 1991), Brazilian actress
João Alves (bishop) (1925–2013), Portuguese Roman Catholic bishop
João Alves de Assis Silva (born 1987), Brazilian footballer known as "Jô"
Jock Alves ( 1909–1979), Rhodesian physician and politician
Lennox Alves (born 1956), Guyanese cricketer
Magno Alves (born 1976), Brazilian footballer
Maria Domingas Alves (born 1959), East Timorese politician
Maurício Alves Peruchi (1990–2014), Brazilian footballer
Robert Alves (1745–1794), Scottish poet and prose writer
Thiago Alves (disambiguation)

See also
Alves da Silva
Alves dos Santos
De Alwis
 Alviss

References

Portuguese-language surnames
Patronymic surnames